George Rae (1817–1902) was a British banker and stockbroker based in Birkenhead. He is most notable for his patronage of the Pre-Raphaelite Brotherhood and his commissioning and acquisition of works by Ford Madox Brown, Arthur Hughes and Dante Gabriel Rossetti. His commissions included Rossetti's The Beloved, commissioned in 1863 for £300 but only completed two years later.
 He later owned Rosetti's Monna Vanna.

He also acquired landscapes by local Liverpool artists like William J Bond and William Davis, hanging his collection in Redcourt, his house in the Wirral.

References

1817 births
1902 deaths
English bankers
English stockbrokers
English art patrons
People associated with the Pre-Raphaelite Brotherhood
19th-century English businesspeople